Onomondo ApS is a Danish MVNO and Internet of Things (IoT) Software Company headquartered in Copenhagen, Denmark. The company offers a global cellular network for IoT and includes the Danish integrated logistics company Maersk as a customer. Onomondo was founded in 2012 under the name Hello World Mobile ApS and has since received funding from Maersk Growth, People Ventures (formerly InQvation), The Danish Growth Fund, and Verdane.

Operations 
Onomondo has built a global cellular network for IoT devices which currently operates in over 180 countries and has integrated more than 700 individual cellular providers.

Onomondo has a fully virtualised network core which it uses to control the networks' their IoT SIMs can access, cloud connectivity to providers such as Azure, security, and data steering.

History 
Hello World Mobile ApS is founded in 2012. 

Hello World Mobile becomes Onomondo and receives 1.2 M € in funding from Danish Sealand Capital and the Market Development Fund. 

Onomondo receives an unknown amount of funding from InQvation (now called People Ventures) in 2019. 

Maersk's corporate venture arm Maersk Growth invests in Onomondo in 2019. Onomondo provides Maersk connectivity for their reefer containers.

The Danish Growth Fund invests in Onomondo in 2021.

In July 2022, it was announced that Onomondo had received $21 USD million through a funding round led by Verdane, a growth equity investment firm, with participation from Maersk Growth, People Ventures, and The Danish Growth Fund.

In February 2023, Onomondo launched the world's first fully virtual IoT SIM. Instead of using a SIM chip, SoftSIM is downloaded from the Cloud onto existing hardware in embedded devices. It is initially being launched on SIMCom's A7672X series modules.

References 

Danish companies established in 2012
Mobile virtual network operators
Technology companies of Denmark
Internet of things companies